Patrick L. Dunn (March 17, 1931  – November 11, 1975) was an American professional basketball player. Dunn was selected in the 1956 NBA draft by the New York Knicks after a collegiate career at Utah State. In one season, which he played for the Philadelphia Warriors, Dunn averaged 2.5 points, 1.1 rebounds and 1.0 assists per game.

Dunn died of leukemia on November 11, 1975. He was inducted into the Illinois Basketball Coaches Hall of Fame in 1976.

References

1931 births
1975 deaths
American men's basketball players
Basketball players from Chicago
Deaths from leukemia
New York Knicks draft picks
Philadelphia Warriors players
Shooting guards
Utah State Aggies men's basketball players